The Canal Museum, formerly known as the "National Waterways Museum Stoke Bruerne" and "The Canal Museum at Stoke Bruerne", is a canal museum located next to the Grand Union Canal just south of the Blisworth Tunnel, near the village of Stoke Bruerne in Northamptonshire.

History
The museum was formerly known as the "National Waterways Museum Stoke Bruerne", one of three museums operated by The Waterways Trust that focused on the history of canals in Britain. After the creation of the Canal & River Trust in 2010, the Stoke Bruerne museum was rebranded as "The Canal Museum", its original name.

Museum
The museum is housed in a restored Grade II listed corn mill at the top of a flight of canal locks, and is one of several museums and attractions operated by the Canal & River Trust, the successor to The Waterways Trust.

The museum tells the story of Britain's inland waterways and the people who worked on them. It provides an insight into the transport system which was fundamental to the industrial revolution in Britain. There are working models and 3-D displays including a model of the short-lived inclined-plane mechanical lift at Foxton in Leicestershire. Exhibits include models of working boats including narrow boats, barges, butties and tugs, painted ware and canal crafts, traditional clothing, canal-side signs and specialist tools.

The museum has a shop and café, and a school/activity room available for educational visits.

See also
London Canal Museum
National Waterways Museum
Gloucester Waterways Museum

References

External links

 The Canal Museum - Canal & River Trust
 The Friends of The Canal Museum

Canal museums in England
Museums in Northamptonshire